Khatauli railway station is a  railway station in Khatauli, a tehsil of Muzaffarnagar district, Uttar Pradesh. Its code is KAT.. There is stoppage of 27 trains per day at Khatauli station. In these 12 trains are Express trains, 9 Passenger trains, 6 MEMU trains. Some important trains are Nauchandi Express (Prayagraj–Saharanpur), Yoga Express (Ahmedabad–Haridwar), Bandra Terminus–Dehradun Express, Shalimar Express (Jammu Tawi–Old Delhi), Delhi–Ambala Cantonment Intercity Express, Chhattisgarh Express etc. The station consists of two platforms. The platforms are well sheltered. It has many facilities including water and sanitation.

In August 2017 the Kalinga Utkal Express derailed near the station around 5:46 pm causing fatalities. About 23 people were killed and more than 100 injured in the incident.

References

Railway stations in Muzaffarnagar district
Delhi railway division